Caleb Patterson-Sewell (born May 20, 1987) is an American soccer coach and former professional player, who currently serves as assistant coach and assistant sporting director with Memphis 901 FC in the USL Championship.

Early life and career
Patterson-Sewell moved with his parents to Australia when he was six years old and grew up in Gatton, Queensland, and began his youth career in Australia with the Toowoomba Raiders junior soccer system. While at the club he was regarded as one of the nation's most promising junior talents. He attended the Queensland Academy of Sport, and played junior football for a variety of youth clubs (Gatton SC, South Toowoomba Raiders, West Wanderers), but it was his play with the Toowoomba Raiders that helped him draw the interest of numerous European clubs. In 2004 Patterson-Sewell joined Anderlecht's reserve side. In late 2004 he was signed by Sheffield Wednesday's youth academy. Patterson-Sewell's spectacular play in goal at Sheffield Wednesday did not go unnoticed by bigger clubs. He was offered a chance to join Liverpool's Under 19 side and spurned Wednesday's contract offers. He appeared in 4 matches for the Liverpool Under 19 side in 2005.

Club career
In 2005–06, Patterson-Sewell returned to Australia once his work permit ran out to sign a temporary contract with Toowoomba Raiders and Mt. Gravatt in the Brisbane Premier League. He was expected to return to Belgium and play for a Liverpool feeder club.

Cleveland City Stars
In 2007, Patterson-Sewell signed with American USL Second Division side Cleveland City Stars instead of returning to Europe in hopes of impressing Major League Soccer clubs. While with Cleveland City, Patterson-Sewell helped the club to its first ever qualification to the US Open Cup in 2007. In eight appearances he had a goals against average of 1.00, including three shut-outs.

New York Red Bulls
In early 2008, Patterson-Sewell went on trial with Major League Soccer club New York Red Bulls. His play in goal impressed New York Red Bulls and he was signed by the club in the 2008 MLS season. Paterson-Sewell made no appearances for Red Bulls and declined a contract offer to remain with club before the start of the 2009 MLS season. At the end of the 2009 season, Patterson-Sewell returned to the New York Red Bulls as the backup goalkeeper. Patterson-Sewell played in all of the preseason games for New York, including the final of the Walt Disney World preseason tournament in Florida, which New York won.

Carolina RailHawks
In February 2009, Patterson-Sewell was signed by Carolina RailHawks of the USL First Division for the USL 1 2009 season. At the end of the 2009–2010 season, New York was granted permission by MLS to sign Patterson-Sewell again on loan due to an "extreme hardship" case.

Miami FC
Patterson-Sewell spent the 2010 USSF Pro League with Miami FC starting 25 games for the club and finishing runner up in the Fans Player of the Year award. In April 2011, Patterson-Sewell signed again with Carolina RailHawks, now playing in the North American Soccer League.

Atlético CP
Patterson-Sewell remained at Carolina RailHawks for only a few months as he was transferred to Portugal in the 2011–2012 season transfer window to newly promoted Liga de Honra club Atlético Clube de Portugal for the 2011–2012 Liga de Honra season. Upon his arrival in Portugal he quickly established himself as Atlético's starting goalkeeper and was nominated for 2012 Goalkeeper of the Year award at the 2012 LPFP Awards.

Vitória de Setúbal
On July 1, 2012, Patterson-Sewell signed with Vitória Setúbal in the Primeira Liga for two years. At the end of the 2012 season Patterson-Sewell asked to be released from his contract.

Gil Vicente
On June 6, 2013, Patterson-Sewell signed with Gil Vicente FC in the Primeira Liga for two seasons following his former Atlético Clube de Portugal manager Joao de Deus.

Rayo OKC
Patterson-Sewell returned to the United States by signing a contract with NASL expansion side Rayo OKC on January 26, 2016. After a few months Caleb asked for a release from his contract allowing him to return to Portugal with SC Farense.

Farense
Patterson-Sewell signed with SC Farense in August 2016, playing 16 games for them, and leading them to a promotion place with one of the best goals against records in the country.

Jacksonville Armada
In February 2017, Patterson-Sewell signed with Jacksonville Armada FC of the North American Soccer League. Patterson-Sewell would finish the 2017 in the top three of all goalkeeper categories. He also broke the Jacksonville Armada FC clean sheet record (10).

Toronto FC
In February 2018, Patterson-Sewell signed with defending MLS champions Toronto FC after Toronto acquired his MLS rights from New York Red Bulls in exchange for a fourth-round pick in the 2019 MLS SuperDraft. As the third-choice keeper for the first team, he has spent much of his time playing for the second team, Toronto FC II. Following the 2019 season, Toronto did not pick up his club option for 2020.

MLS Pool Goalkeeper
Following a failed move to a team in Asia, Patteson-Sewell signed with Major League Soccer to serve as the league's pool goalkeeper. He trained with Nashville SC while serving in the role.

Toronto FC II
In 2021, he signed as a player-coach with Toronto FC II. He retired following the 2021 season.

International career
Patterson-Sewell is an American Australian and is eligible to represent the Australia national soccer team. The goalkeeper coach for Australia, Tony Franken, flew to Portugal to watch Patterson-Sewell play. Local media reports suggested Patterson-Sewell would be called up for Australia for their friendly against Romania.

Coaching career
In 2021, he joined Toronto FC II in USL League One as a player-coach, serving as an assistant and goalkeeping coach, as well as a player.

In 2022, following his official retirement from playing, he joined Memphis 901 FC in the USL Championship as assistant sporting director and assistant coach.

Career statistics

Honors
New York Red Bulls
 Major League Soccer Western Conference: 2008

References

External links
 
 

1987 births
Living people
American soccer players
Soccer players from Tennessee
People from Hendersonville, Tennessee
Association football goalkeepers
R.S.C. Anderlecht players
Sheffield Wednesday F.C. players
Liverpool F.C. players
Cleveland City Stars players
New York Red Bulls players
North Carolina FC players
Miami FC (2006) players
Atlético Clube de Portugal players
Vitória F.C. players
Gil Vicente F.C. players
Rayo OKC players
S.C. Farense players
Jacksonville Armada FC players
Toronto FC players
Toronto FC II players
USL Championship players
USL League One players
North American Soccer League players
USSF Division 2 Professional League players
USL First Division players
USL Second Division players
Primeira Liga players
Liga Portugal 2 players
Campeonato de Portugal (league) players
American expatriate soccer players
Expatriate soccer players in Australia
American expatriate sportspeople in Australia
Expatriate footballers in Belgium
American expatriate sportspeople in Belgium
Expatriate footballers in England
American expatriate sportspeople in England
Expatriate footballers in Portugal
American expatriate sportspeople in Portugal
Toronto FC II coaches
USL League One coaches